Laccocephalum is a genus of fungi in the family Polyporaceae. The genus was discovered in 1895 by Daniel McAlpine and Otto Tepper.

Species
Laccocephalum basilapidoides McAlpine & Tepper (1895)
Laccocephalum hartmannii (Cooke) Núñez & Ryvarden (1995) – Lord Howe Island
Laccocephalum mylittae (Cooke & Massee) Núñez & Ryvarden (1995) – Australia
Laccocephalum sclerotinum (Rodway) Núñez & Ryvarden (1995)
Laccocephalum tumulosum  (Cooke & Massee) Núñez & Ryvarden (1995) – Australia

References

Polyporaceae
Polyporales genera
Taxa described in 1895
Taxa named by Daniel McAlpine